John George Bennett (January 20, 1891—November 20, 1957) was an American prelate of the Roman Catholic Church. He served as bishop of the Diocese of Lafayette in Indiana from 1945 until his death in 1957.

Biography

Early life 
John Bennett was born in Dunnington, Indiana, and studied at St. Joseph's College and St. Meinrad Seminary. He was ordained to the priesthood by Bishop Herman Joseph Alerding for the Diocese of Fort Wayne on June 27, 1914. After his ordination, Bennett served as a curate at St. Peter Parish in Fort Wayne, Indiana (1914-1927), as pastor of St. Joseph Parish in Garrett, Indiaian (1927-1944), and defensor vinculi of the diocese (1929-1944).

Bishop of Lafayette 
On November 11, 1944, Bennett was appointed as the first bishop of the newly erected Diocese of Lafayette by Pope Pius XII. He received his episcopal consecration on January 10, 1945, from Bishop John F. Noll, with Bishops Francis Cotton and John O'Hara, serving as co-consecrators. John Bennett died on November 20, 1957 at age 66.

References

External links
Roman Catholic Diocese of Lafayette, Indiana Official website

Episcopal succession

1891 births
1957 deaths
People from Benton County, Indiana
Roman Catholic Diocese of Fort Wayne–South Bend
20th-century Roman Catholic bishops in the United States
Roman Catholic bishops of Lafayette in Indiana